The Wand Company is a United Kingdom company that designs and manufactures universal remote control prop replicas in varying designs.  The company was featured on Dragons' Den in 2010, demonstrating its "Kymera Magic Wand Universal Remote Control", and accepted an offer of financial backing of £200,000. Since then, The Wand Company has created additional Universal remote control products in the form of the Tenth Doctor's Sonic Screwdriver, the Eleventh Doctor's Sonic Screwdriver, the Twelfth Doctor's extending Sonic Screwdriver and two Star Trek replicas: a Star Trek: The Original Series phaser released in November 2014 and a Star Trek Bluetooth communicator, which was released in June 2016.

History
The Wand Company was found in 2009 by Richard Blakesley and Chris Barnardo who wanted to combine their forty years of design, development and electronic development experience and make magical/surprising themed products that work as universal remote controls.   The company's first product was the "Kymera Magic Wand Universal Remote Control" that is in the style of a wizard's wand and in the first year the product sold 10,300 units.

In 2010 the company went onto the television show Dragons' Den on BBC Two to ask for financial backing, Duncan Bannatyne agreed to invest £200,000 for 10%. In 2011 Bannatyne announced that The Wand Company had grossed £1 million in the first year.

In 2012 the company manufactured a new product in the form of the Eleventh Doctor's Sonic Screwdriver, later in 2013 the Tenth Doctor's Sonic Screwdriver was released. A 3D Scan was taken of David Tennant's Sonic Screwdriver (which is the last remaining screen used prop from that series) to create the body of the Tenth Doctor's Sonic Screwdriver.

In July 2014 it was revealed on the company's Facebook page, that the next product they would be releasing would be a Star Trek phaser replica. Later that month the phaser replica was shown at San Diego Comic-Con by co-founder Chris Barnardo, The Wand Company stated that it used the same technology as the Sonic Screwdriver remotes and that a 3D scan was taken of the original prop to produce this replica.

In July 2015, they revealed they would be releasing a fully functioning Star Trek Bluetooth communicator. The item was released in June 2016.

In July 2020 they announced they will release a fully functional Star Trek Tricorder which is to be released at the end of 2021.

References

External links
 

Electronics companies established in 2009
2009 establishments in England
Remote control
Electronics companies of the United Kingdom